The 1970 Tour de Suisse was the 34th edition of the Tour de Suisse cycle race and was held from 11 June to 19 June 1970. The race started in Murten and finished in Zürich. The race was won by Roberto Poggiali of the Salvarani team.

General classification

References

1970
Tour de Suisse
June 1970 sports events in Europe